Grandpré is a commune in the Ardennes department in northern France. On 1 January 2016, the former commune Termes was merged into Grandpré.

Population

See also
Communes of the Ardennes department

References

Communes of Ardennes (department)
Communes nouvelles of Ardennes
Ardennes communes articles needing translation from French Wikipedia